Karl Henrik Axel Löfkvist (born 5 May 1995) is a Swedish professional footballer who plays for Jönköpings Södra, as a defender.

Club career
On 17 January 2022, Löfkvist signed a two-year contract with Jönköpings Södra.

References

1995 births
Living people
Swedish footballers
Akropolis IF players
Dalkurd FF players
Kalmar FF players
Jönköpings Södra IF players
Allsvenskan players
Superettan players
Ettan Fotboll players
Association football defenders